The Korhites in the Bible were a Levitical family descended from Korah. 

Book of Exodus people
Levites